The 2022 Porsche Carrera Cup Scandinavia was the 19th Porsche Carrera Cup Scandinavia season. It began on 13 May at Anderstorp Raceway and ended on 1 October at Mantorp Park. The championship was primarily made up of the Porsche 911 GT3 Cup (Type 992), however teams could run the older Porsche 911 GT3 Cup (Type 991 II) and be entered into the "Porsche Approved Cup" category.

Entry list

Results

Championship standings 
Race format

Race 1 is a 20-minute + 1 lap race being set by the results of Q1. Race 2 is a 30-minute + 1 lap race with 11th and below being set by Q1 results and the top 10 being set by a top-ten shootout in Q2. If there are three races, Q1 sets the grid for Race 1 and Race 2 with Q2 setting the grid for Race 3.

Scoring system

Drivers' Championship 
Those highlighted in blue are Porsche Approved Cup entries.

Porsche Approved Cup

Teams' Championship

Notes

References

External links 

Porsche Carrera Cup Scandinavia
Porsche Carrera Cup seasons